Pomerantz or Pomeranz may refer to the following:

 Abraham Pomerantz (1903–1982), American lawyer, father of Charlotte Pomerantz
 Charles Pomerantz (1896–1973), American entomologist
 Charlotte Pomerantz (born 1930), American children's book author, daughter of Abraham Pomerantz
 David Pomeranz (born 1951), American singer-songwriter
 Drew Pomeranz (born 1988), American baseball pitcher
 Gary M. Pomerantz (born 1960), American author and journalist
 Hart Pomerantz, Canadian lawyer and television personality
 Irith Pomeranz, Israeli electrical engineer
 Kenneth Pomeranz (born 1958), American economic historian
 Margaret Pomeranz (born 1944), Australian film critic
 Mark F. Pomerantz (born 1951), American attorney
 Martin A. Pomerantz (1916–2008), American physicist
 Mike Pomeranz (born 1967), American TV news anchor
 Roza Pomerantz-Meltzer (died 1934), the first woman elected to the Parliament of Poland

See also
 Pomerance
 Pomerants
 Arnold Pomerans (1920–2005), German-born British translator